Myriocoleopsis fluviatilis is a species of liverworts in the family Lejeuneaceae. It is endemic to Brazil.  Its natural habitat is rivers. It is threatened by habitat loss.

References

Lejeuneaceae
Flora of Brazil
Vulnerable plants
Taxonomy articles created by Polbot